Say Goodbye may refer to:

Film 
 Say Goodbye (film), a 1971 American documentary film
 Say Good-bye, a UK film, winner of the 1990 BAFTA Award for Best Short Film

Music

Albums 
Say Goodbye (album), a 1989 album by Shirley Kwan

Songs 
"Say Goodbye" (Beck song), 2014
"Say Goodbye" (Cheap Trick song), 1997
"Say Goodbye" (Chris Brown song), 2006
"Say Goodbye" (Dave Matthews Band song), 1996
"Say Goodbye" (Hunters & Collectors song), 1986
"Say Goodbye" (Indecent Obsession song), 1989
"Say Goodbye" (Krewella song), 2014
"Say Goodbye" (La Cream song), 1999
"Say Goodbye" (S Club song), 2003
"Say Goodbye", by Ashlee Simpson from I Am Me
"Say Goodbye", by Bonnie Tyler
"Say Goodbye", by Brooke Allison from Brooke Allison
"Say Goodbye", by Chelsea Grin from Self Inflicted
"Say Goodbye", by Fleetwood Mac from Say You Will
"Say Goodbye", by French Montana from Montana
"Say Goodbye", by Gabrielle from Now and Always: 20 Years of Dreaming
"Say Goodbye", by Gotthard from Homerun
"Say Goodbye", by Green Day from Revolution Radio
"Say Goodbye", by I Killed the Prom Queen from Music for the Recently Deceased
"Say Goodbye", by Jordan Knight with Debbie Gibson from Love Songs
"Say Goodbye", by Katharine McPhee from Unbroken
"Say Goodbye", by Khan featuring Julee Cruise
"Say Goodbye", by Krokus from Change of Address
"Say Goodbye", by Mandisa from What If We Were Real
"Say Goodbye", by Norah Jones from Little Broken Hearts
"Say Goodbye", by Skillet from Comatose
"Say Goodbye", by Theory of a Deadman from Gasoline
"Say Goodbye", by Tom Chaplin from Twelve Tales of Christmas
"Say Goodbye", by Uriah Heep from Outsider

See also
Goodbye (disambiguation)
Never Say Goodbye (disambiguation)
"Say Goodbye Good", a song by The Promise Ring from Wood/Water